(August 23, 1909 – November 16, 1979) was a Japanese film composer.

Film score 
He made film music for 334 films including:
 The Record of a Tenement Gentleman (長屋紳士録 Nagaya shinshiroku) (1947)
 Mother (おかあさん Okaasan) (1952)
 Lightning (稲妻 Inazuma) (1952)
 Tea Over Rice or The Flavor of Green Tea over Rice (お茶漬けの味 Ochazuke no aji) (1952)
 The Life of Oharu (西鶴一代女 Saikaku Ichidai Onna) (1952)
 Wife (妻 Tsuma) (1953) 
 A Geisha (祇園囃子 Gion Bayashi) (1953)
 Older Brother, Younger Sister (あにいもうと Ani Imōto) (1953)
 Sound of the Mountain (山の音 Yama no Oto) (1954)
 Onna no Koyomi (1954)
 Late Chrysanthemums (晩菊 Bangiku) (1954)
 Floating Clouds (浮雲 Ukigumo) (1955)
 The Romance of Yushima (婦系図 湯島の白梅 Onna Keizu Yushima no Shiraume) (1955)
 (驟雨 Shūu) (1956)
 A Wife's Heart (妻の心 Tsuma no kokoro) (1956)
 Flowing (流れる Nagareru) (1956)
 (朱雀門 Suzakumon) (1957)
 Untamed or Untamed Woman (あらくれ Arakure) (1957)
 (弥太郎笠 Yatarō gasa) (1957)
 The Loyal 47 Ronin (忠臣蔵 Chūshingura) (1958)
 Autumn Has Already Started (Aki tachinu) (1960) 
 As a Wife, As a Woman (1961)
 Yearning (乱れる Midareru) (1964)
 Execution in Autumn (秋決 Qiujue) (1972)

References

External links 
 

1909 births
1979 deaths
20th-century Japanese composers
Japanese film score composers
Japanese male film score composers